AttenCHUN! is the debut album by rapper Bone Crusher. Produced by Jermaine Dupri, the album was released on April 29, 2003 by So So Def/Arista. The album's only single "Never Scared", which featured fellow rappers Killer Mike and T.I., was featured on BET and Madden NFL 2004. The album received a mixed reception from critics regarding its production, overreliance on interludes and Crusher's vocal delivery.

Critical reception 

AttenCHUN! received mixed reviews from music critics who questioned the production, overreliance on interludes and Crusher's vocal delivery. Rob Theakston of AllMusic said that despite the album feeling over-stuffed with clichéd interludes and stale beats, he praised Crusher's vocal delivery for being interesting and working well with the featured guests, saying that "it's still better than most coming out of the Dirty South in 2003." HipHopDX writer Jacintah also commented on the lacking production and Crusher's delivery on the hooks as negatives but still complimented the album for showcasing Crusher's charismatic delivery and being able to transcend different emotions throughout the tracks. Spyce of The Situation said that after the second track, the album begins to go flat in its beats and Crusher's hard-edged delivery starts to meander, saying that "Even die hard fans will be hard pressed to find anything fresh and unexpected on this album which results in you feeling that you missed out on something." Rolling Stone criticized the album for being over-packed with production and vocals that were lacking and monotonous.

Track listing

Bonus track listing 
 "Never Scared (The Takeover Remix)" (featuring Cam'ron, Jadakiss & Busta Rhymes)
 "Never Scared (Football Remix)"

Charts

Weekly charts

Year-end charts

See also
 List of Billboard number-one R&B albums of 2003

References 

2003 debut albums
Bone Crusher (rapper) albums
So So Def Recordings albums
Arista Records albums
Albums produced by Jermaine Dupri